Harbour Main, formerly Harbour Main-Whitbourne and Harbour Main-Bell Island, is a provincial electoral district for the House of Assembly of Newfoundland and Labrador, Canada. Prior to 1975, the district elected two MHAs.

Between 1972 and the year 2000, it was a Tory stronghold, apart from a two-term Liberal breakthrough in the 1990s. 

It includes the southern portion of the town of Conception Bay South and the town of Holyrood, the farthest extern of the St. John's Metropolitan Area. As of 2011 the district has 9,005 eligible voters.

Members of the House of Assembly
The district has elected the following Members of the House of Assembly:

Dual-Member District

Single-Member District

Election results

References

External links 
Website of the Newfoundland and Labrador House of Assembly

Newfoundland and Labrador provincial electoral districts